John James Kirton (born 1948) is professor emeritus of political science and the director and founder of the G7 Research Group, director and founder of the G20 Research Group, founder and co-director (with James Orbinski) of the Global Health Diplomacy Program, and founder and co-founder (with Marina Larionova of the Russian Presidential Academy of National Economy and Public Administration) of the BRICS Research Group, based at University of Trinity College in the University of Toronto.

He received his B.A. in Political Science in 1971 from the University of Toronto, his M.A. in International Affairs in 1973 from Carleton University, and his Ph.D. in International Studies in 1977 from the Paul H. Nitze School of Advanced International Studies at Johns Hopkins University.

He specializes in Canadian foreign policy, the G7, G8, G20, BRICS and global governance, global health governance, and trade and the environment.

As a scholar of Canadian foreign policy, Kirton pioneered the complex neo-realist theory of Canada's emergence as a principal power in the world through his major books, Canada as a Principal Power (co-written with David Dewitt) and Canadian Foreign Policy in a Changing World.

In the field of trade and environment, Kirton led the multinational, multidisciplinary team that developed an analytical framework for assessing the environmental effects of the North American Free Trade Agreement (NAFTA) and identified the many ways in which the Commission for Environmental Cooperation, North America's first regional organization of consequence, enhanced ecological quality throughout the region and beyond. He has also served as a member of Canada's National Round Table on the Environment and the Economy.

The author or editor of more than 35 books, Kirton is the editor of the Global Governance book series as well as co-editor (with Miranda Schreurs) of the Global Environmental Governance book series published by Routledge Publishing; he was also co-editor (with Michele Fratianni and Paolo Savona) of the Global Finance series published by Ashgate Publishing. He is co-editor of several publications on the G7 and G20 and also a series on "Health: A Political Choice" published by GT Media.

He is active in various volunteer activities, and serves on the board of the NATO Council of Canada (formerly The Atlantic Council of Canada) and the Empire Club of Canada. He was a member of the board of the Couchiching Institute on Public Affairs for many years until 2013. He continues to play an advisory role for Couchiching events which are now hosted by the Canadian International Council.

Selected bibliography
Reconfiguring the Global Governance of Climate Change (co-authored with Ella Kokotsis and Brittaney Warren (Routledge, 2022)
Accountability for Effectiveness in Global Governance (co-edited with Marina Larionova (Routledge, 2017)
China's G20 Leadership (Routledge, 2016)
The Global Governance of Climate Change: G7, G20 and UN Leadership (with Ella Kokotsis; Ashgate, 2015)
The G8-G20 Relationship in Global Governance (co-edited with Marina Larionova; Ashgate, 2015)
Moving Health Sovereignty in Africa: Disease, Governance, Climate Change (co-edited with Andrew F. Cooper, Franklyn Lisk and Hany Besada; Ashgate, 2014).
Africa's Health Challenges Sovereignty, Mobility of People and Healthcare Governance (co-edited with Andrew F. Cooper, Franklyn Lisk and Hany Besada; Farnham: Ashgate, 2013).
Making Global Economic Governance Effective: Hard and Soft Law Institutions in a Crowded World (co-edited with Marina Larionova and Paolo Savona; Ashgate, 2010).
Innovation in Global Health Governance: Critical Cases (co-edited with Andrew F. Cooper; Ashgate, 2009).
Canadian Foreign Policy in a Changing World (Nelson Thomson, 2007).
Financing Development: The G8 and UN Contribution (co-edited with Michele Fratianni and Paolo Savona; Ashgate, 2007).
Governing Global Health: Challenge, Response, Innovation (co-edited with Andrew F. Cooper and Ted Schrecker; Ashgate, 2007).
An Environment-First Foreign Policy for Canada (Remarks prepared for an Experts Roundtable on "Foreign Policy Dialogue: Environment and Canadian Foreign Policy," Ottawa, May 12, 2003).
Governing Globalization: The G8's Contribution for the Twenty-First Century (Revised version of a paper prepared for a conference on "Russia within the "Group of Eight," sponsored by the Institute for Applied International Research, April 11–12, 2003).
Building Democratic Partnerships: The G8-Civil Society Link (Paper prepared for the Third Annual EnviReform Conference: Sustainability, Civil Society and International Governance: Local, North American and Global Perspectives, November 8, 2002).
Governing Global Finance: New Challenges, G7 and IMF Contributions (co-edited with Michele Fratianni and Paolo Savona; Ashgate, 2002).
Linking Trade, Environment, and Social Cohesion: NAFTA Experiences, Global Challenges (co-edited with Virginia Maclaren; Ashgate, 2002).
Environmental Regulations and Corporate Strategy (with Alan Rugman and Julie Soloway; Oxford University Press, 1999).
The G8’s Role in the New Millennium (co-edited with Michael Hodges and Joseph Daniels; Ashgate, 1999).
Canadian Foreign Policy: Selected Cases (co-edited with Don Munton; Prentice-Hall, 1993).
Canada as a Principal Power (with David Dewitt; John Wiley, 1983).
The International Joint Commission Seventy Years On (with Robert Spencer and Kim Richard Nossal; Centre for International Studies, University of Toronto, 1981).

References

 Kirton, John.  "A Primer on the G8,"  Forbes, July 7, 2008.
 Woods, Allan. "G8/G20 summit junkies gear up," "Toronto Star," June 3, 2010.

External links
G7 Information Centre
G20 Information Centre
BRICS Information Centre
Global Health Diplomacy Program
Trinity College in the University of Toronto
EnviReform Project
Routledge Publishing's Global Governance Series
Routledge Publishing's Global Environmental Governance Series
GT Media publications
 Personal website

Living people
Canadian Anglicans
Canadian political scientists
Academic staff of the University of Toronto
University of Toronto alumni
Carleton University alumni
Johns Hopkins University alumni
1948 births